The Cardinal District is a high school conference in the state of Virginia that  includes schools exclusively from Prince William County.

Membership History

Current members
C.D. Hylton Bulldogs of Woodbridge
Colgan Sharks of Manassas
Forest Park Bruins of Woodbridge
Freedom Eagles of Woodbridge
Gar-Field Red Wolves of Woodbridge
Potomac Panthers of Dumfries
Woodbridge Vikings of Woodbridge

Former Members
Battlefield Bobcats of Haymarket (2013-2017)
Osbourn Eagles of Manassas (2013-2017)
Osbourn Park Yellow Jackets of Manassas (2013-2017)
Stonewall Jackson Raiders of Manassas (2013-2017)
Patriot Pioneers of Nokesville (2013-2017)

Virginia High School League